The Ghana Wildlife Society is a conservationist NGO seeking to support Ghana's diverse wildlife to help provide both a "better environment" and an "improved quality of life for all people." It is BirdLife International's partner in Ghana. The society was formed in the early 1970s but suffered from a hiatus in its activities. It was restarted in 1991 through a "Save the Seashore Birds Project - Ghana (SSPC-G)". This project ended in June 1994 and the Society took over the work of that project.

The Society is involved with many conservation projects including: the Important Bird Areas Project-Ghana, the Amanzuri Community Integrated Project, the Mount Afadjato Community Forest Conservation Project, the Wetlands and Waterbird Conservation Project, the Conservation Awareness Programme in schools and communities, and the Marine Turtle Conservation Programme. The projects are supported by a range of overseas donors including: Royal Society for the Protection of Birds, the UNDP and the Royal Netherlands Embassy in Ghana.

References

External links 

 

Animal charities
Bird conservation organizations
Charities based in Ghana
Environmental organisations based in Ghana
Wildlife conservation organizations